Robert Braknis (born January 8, 1973) is a Canadian former competition swimmer, who competed for his native country at the 1996 Summer Olympics. There he finished in 16th position in the 100-metre backstroke and in twelfth place with the men's relay team in the 4x100-medley relay.  Braknis set the Canadian and Commonwealth record in the 50-metre backstroke in 1994.

Braknis is a graduate of Florida State University where he was a 7-time All-American and the Atlantic Coast Conference Swimmer of the Year in 1995.

He was also a torch-bearer for the 2010 Winter Olympics torch relay. 

He is a retired police officer for the Peel Regional Police in Brampton, Ontario.

See also
 List of Commonwealth Games medallists in swimming (men)

References

External links
 Canadian Olympic Committee

1973 births
Living people
Canadian male backstroke swimmers
Canadian male freestyle swimmers
Florida State Seminoles men's swimmers
Olympic swimmers of Canada
Swimmers from Montreal
Swimmers at the 1996 Summer Olympics
Commonwealth Games medallists in swimming

Commonwealth Games silver medallists for Canada
Swimmers at the 1994 Commonwealth Games
Medallists at the 1994 Commonwealth Games